Zacarias de Góis e Vasconcelos (5 November 1815, in Valença, Bahia – 29 December 1877, in Rio de Janeiro) was a Brazilian politician and monarchist during the period of the Empire of Brazil (1822–1889). He was Prime Minister for three times.

1815 births
1877 deaths
Prime Ministers of Brazil
Finance Ministers of Brazil
Presidents of the Chamber of Deputies (Brazil)
Brazilian monarchists